Fluke is the debut full-length studio album by Canadian alternative rock band Rusty, released in 1995. The album was nominated for the Juno Award for Best Alternative Album at the 1996 Juno Awards.

Overview
Fluke was recorded in five days at Presence Studio in Toronto. The album was produced by Chris Wardman, who also played acoustic guitar on the tracks "Groovy Dead" and "California". The album features the singles "Wake Me", "Groovy Dead", "Misogyny", and "California".

In popular culture
The song "Misogyny" was featured in the 1996 film Hustler White.
The song "Punk" was included on the soundtrack to the 1996 comedy film Black Sheep. The song is featured in the film during the scene in which David Spade and Chris Farley's characters headbang to the song in their car.

Track listing
All tracks written by Scott McCullough, Ken MacNeil, Jim Moore, and Mitch Perkins.

 "Groovy Dead" - 3:43
 "Punk" - 1:54
 "Wake Me" - 4:09
 "Warning" - 3:38
 "KD Lang" - 3:16
 "California" - 4:26
 "Misogyny" - 5:36
 "Billy Boy" - 3:56
 "Tar Water" - 1:47
 "Ceiling" -  4:31

References

1995 albums
Rusty (band) albums